Linards is a Latvian masculine given name that is a variant of the Germanic name Lennart. Individuals with the name Linards linclude:

Linards Grantiņš (born 1950), Latvian human rights activist
Linards Reiziņš (1924–1991), Latvian mathematician
Linards Tauns (1922–1963), Latvian writer

References 

Latvian masculine given names